The North Vanuatu languages form a linkage of Southern Oceanic languages spoken in northern Vanuatu.

Languages

Clark (2009)
Clark (2009) provides the following classification of the North Vanuatu languages, divided into two main geographic areas (Torres–Banks–Maewo–Ambae–Pentecost and Santo). Outlier (aberrant) languages identified by Clark (2009) are in italics.

North Vanuatu
Northern (Torres–Banks–Maewo–Ambae–Pentecost)
Torres–Banks languages
Torres Islands: Hiw, Lo-Toga (“Loh”)
Banks Islands: Lehali–Löyöp (“Ureparapara”), Mwotlap–Volow (“Mwotlav”), Lemerig–Vera’a (“Vera'a”), Vurës–Mwesen (“Vurës”), Mota, Nume, Dorig–Koro–Olrat (“South Gaua”), Lakon (“Lakona”), Mwerlap (“Merlav”)
Maewo–Ambae–North Pentecost
Maewo: Sun̄wadia, Sun̄wadaga, Baetora
Ambae: Duidui, Northeast Ambae
North Pentecost: Raga
South Pentecost: Ske (“Seke”); Apma, Sa
Espiritu Santo languages
Cape Cumberland (Nokuku); Tolomako
Wusi, Akei–Tasiriki–Tangoa–Araki (“SW Santo”), Tiale–Merei (“Central Santo”), Kiai, “South-central Santo”, M̈av̈ea (“Mafea”), Tutuba, Aore, Tamambo (“Tamabo”); Mores
Southeast Santo, Shark Bay; Sakao

François (2015)
The following list of 9 "Penama" North Vanuatu languages (that is, the North Vanuatu languages excluding the Torres–Banks and Espiritu Santo languages) is from François (2015:18-21).

References 

 .

 
Southern Oceanic languages
Languages of Vanuatu